Harold Toliver  is an American literary critic, theorist and writer. Currently, he is professor emeritus at the University of California, Irvine. His research interests are in the areas of  Renaissance and seventeenth-century literature, English and Comparative Literature, Literary Theory & Criticism. He received Guggenheim awards  (1964, 1976) and  the Distinguished Research Award (1982). Toliver is married and has two children.

Biography
Harold Earl Toliver was born on February 16, 1932, in McMinnville, Oregon, United States. He is the son of a Yamhill County farmers Marion E. Toliver and Mable A. (Mallery) Toliver. He served in the United States Army, Private first class, 1954–1956. Toliver graduated from University of Oregon, (Bachelor of Arts, 1954) and Johns Hopkins University (Master of Arts, 1958). He earned his doctorate at the University of Washington in 1961. From 1961 to 1964, Toliver taught at Ohio State University. He was a professor of English at UCLA (1965–1966), and then a Professor of English and Comparative Literature at the University of California, Irvine, where he taught for thirty years.

Harold Toliver was an active participant in  the well-known School of Criticism and Theory which was founded by a group of leading scholars and critical theorists in 1976.
He worked together with such outstanding scholars as Murray Krieger, J. Hillis Miller and Geoffrey Wolff.

During his career, Toliver wrote and edited several books, while also making numerous contributions to scholarly journals. He has, until recently, published mainly literary criticism and history. His books include Transported Styles in Shakespeare and Milton, The Past That Poets Make, and Lyric Provinces in the English Renaissance.

In his more recent publications Toliver has expanded into applications of modern science to the history of ideas to critique the more prominent and durable misconceptions of world history. Since retiring, he has been writing fiction—mainly mysteries under the name of Hal Toliver with Mary Toliver. Titles include Leave Not a Trace (Publish America), Bitterroot (Pentland Press), Done in Blood-Red Ochre (Pentland Press) and Pageant of the Mortals.

Harold Toliver lives in Laguna Beach, California, with his wife Mary (Bennette) Toliver. His other interests include cycling and tennis.

Publications

Journal Articles 
The Dance Under the Greenwood Tree: Hardy's Bucolics. Journal Article. Nineteenth-Century Fiction. University of California Press, Vol. 17, No. 1, June, 1962, pp. 57–68
The Strategy of Marvell's Resolve against Created Pleasure. Journal Article. SEL: Studies in English Literature 1500–1900, Vol. 4, No. 1, Winter, 1964, pp. 57–69
Falstaff, the Prince, and the History Play. Journal Article. Shakespeare Quarterly, Vol. 16, No. 1 (Winter, 1965), pp. 63–80
Herrick's Book of Realms and Moments. Journal Article. ELH Vol. 49, No. 2 (Summer, 1982), pp. 429–448. The Johns Hopkins University Press.
Workable Fictions in the Henry IV Plays. University of Toronto Quarterly. Volume 53 Issue 1, September 1983, pp. 53–72. Published Online: March 5, 2013.
Herbert's Interim and Final Places. Journal Article. SEL: Studies in English Literature 1500–1900, Vol. 24, No. 1, The English Renaissance (Winter, 1984), pp. 105–120

Books (non-fiction) 
Perspectives on poetry. Editor with James L. Calderwood. New York, Oxford University Press, 1968
Perspectives on drama. Editor with James L. Calderwood. New York : Oxford University Press, 1968
Perspectives on Fiction. Editor with James L. Calderwood. Oxford University Press, New York (1968)
Essays in Shakespearean criticism. Editor with James L. Calderwood. Englewood Cliffs, N.J.. Prentice-Hall, 1970, 
Pastoral Forms and Attitudes. University of California Press, 1972, 
Animate Illusions: Explorations of Narrative Structure. University of Nebraska Press. 1973, 
Animate illusions; explorations of narrative structure. Lincoln, University of Nebraska Press 1974, 
Marvell's Ironic Vision. Yale University Press, 1981
The Past That Poets Make. Harvard University Press, 1981, 
Lyric Provinces in the English Renaissance. Ohio State Univ Pr; 1986, 
Transported Styles in Shakespeare and Milton. Pennsylvania State University Press, 1989, 
George Herbert's Christian Narrative. Penn State University Press; 2005,

Books (fiction) 
Obituary Quilt (Bea Ellis Mysteries Series Vol. 1. (With Mary Toliver). Burgundy Books, 1998, 
Done in Blood-Red Ochr. (With Mary Toliver). Pentland Press (NC), 2000, 
Bitterroot Paperback. (With Mary Toliver). Pentland Press (NC), 2000,

References

External links
Personal Site

1932 births
American literary critics
Johns Hopkins University alumni
University of California, Irvine faculty
20th-century American non-fiction writers
Living people